The Danae or D class consisted of eight light cruisers built for the Royal Navy at the end of World War I which also saw service in World War II.

Design

This gave an 'A', 'B', 'P', 'Q', 'X', 'Y' arrangement. Additionally, the twin  torpedo tubes in the C class were replaced by triples, giving the Danaes a total of twelve tubes, the heaviest torpedo armament for a cruiser at the time. Machinery and general layout was otherwise the same as the Ceres group of C-class cruisers. However, Danae, Dauntless and Dragon were ordered before the Capetown group, and therefore did not incorporate the improved bow design of the latter; the C class were very wet forwards, and in the Capetowns sheer was increased forwards into a knuckled "trawler bow". Such was the success of the knuckled bow that it was incorporated into all subsequent British cruisers (except  of 1935 which was completed without). Despatch and Diomede had their beam increased by ½ foot to increase stability and Dragon and Dauntless were completed with a hangar for a floatplane built into the bridge, the compass platform being on top. Delhi, Dunedin, Durban, Despatch and Diomede were provided with flying-off platforms for a wheeled aircraft aft. Despatch and Diomede were completed with 4 inch anti-aircraft (A/A) guns vis 12 pounder (3 inch) guns in their sisters and Diomede had 'A' gun shipped in a weatherproof housing CP Mark XVI, an encouraging development for gun crews hitherto exposed to the worst of the elements on the fo'c'sle.

Modifications

The lessons of the Battle of Jutland were applied and protection was improved in detail. Additional torpedo tubes were installed and depth charge throwers were also included. The Mk XII  gun was retained but, in Diomede, a new prototype gun house (allowing greater elevation) was used and found to be most satisfactory.

Inter-war, all ships had their anti-aircraft armament standardised as three QF 4 inch Mark V guns on mountings HA Mark III, with a QF 2 pdr Mk.II gun in each bridge wing. All aircraft equipment were removed and Dragon and Dauntless had their bridges rebuilt along the lines of the rest of the class.

Early modifications in World War II included the addition of Radar Type 286 air warning at the foremast head and, later, Type 273 centimetric target indication set on the searchlight platform amidships. Between 6 and 8 20 mm Oerlikon guns were generally added, replacing the old 2 pounder guns in the bridge wings, on either side of 'P' and 'Q' guns and on the quarterdeck. In 1942, Dauntless (and in 1943, Danae) had the aft 4 inch A/A gun replaced by a quadruple mounting Mark VII for the 2 pounder Mark VIII gun and in 1943, Danae and Dragon had 'P' gun and the forward pair of  guns replaced by two such mountings and their Radar Type 282 equipped directors.
Dragon and Danae were taken in hand again in 1943 and had the aft 4 inch / 2 pounder mountings replaced by a twin Mounting Mark XIX for the QF 4 inch Mark XVI gun. Danae also received twin in lieu of single Oerlikon mounts and later received a pair of single Bofors 40 mm guns. Diomede landed her torpedo tubes in 1943 and received one twin mount "Hazemeyer" Mark IV and two single mounts Mark III for Bofors guns.

Between 1941 and 1942, Delhi was rebuilt in the United States as an anti-aircraft vessel. All armaments were removed, and five 5 inch L/38 Mark 12 guns in Mark 30 single mountings were added, controlled by a pair of Mark 37 Fire Control Systems. The guns were in all but the former 'P' position. She carried a new bridge and stepped light tripod masts fore and aft, carrying Type 291 air warning radar. A Type 273 target indication radar was added amidships and a Type 285 on the Mark 37 FCS for target ranging and bearings. The light armament consisted of two quadruple 2 pounder mounts Mark VII and their directors with Radar Type 282, a pair of twin Oerlikon mounts Mark V in the bridge wings and six single Mark III Oerlikon pedestal mounts.

Dragon and Durban were expended as breakwaters in support of the Normandy landings in June 1944, Dragon being replaced in Polish service by the Danae (as ORP Conrad) and Despatch was disarmed as a depot ship.

Ships 

Three ships were ordered in September 1916 under the War Emergency Programme:

Notes

References

External links
Ships of the Danae class

Cruiser classes
 
Ship classes of the Royal Navy